Oliver Beer (born 14 September 1979) is a German former professional footballer and current coach. He is last coached 1860 Munich.

References

External links

1979 births
Living people
German footballers
Germany under-21 international footballers
Association football defenders
2. Bundesliga players
FC Bayern Munich II players
1. FC Schweinfurt 05 players
FC Ingolstadt 04 players
SC Preußen Münster players
VfL Osnabrück players
TSV 1860 Munich managers
Footballers from Bavaria
Sportspeople from Regensburg
German football managers